Duncan Forbes (1922 – 3 December 1994) was a Scottish historian.

Forbes edited Adam Ferguson's An Essay on the History of Civil Society for the University of Edinburgh Press in 1966. In 1970 Pelican Books published the volumes of David Hume's History of Great Britain that covered the early Stuarts, to which Forbes wrote the introduction.

In his book Hume's Philosophical Politics, Forbes argued that Hume's main purpose in writing The History of England was to give "the Hanoverian regime a proper intellectual foundation". Against the traditional portrayal of Hume as a Tory, Forbes labelled Hume's beliefs "skeptical Whiggism", that is, an acceptance of the Revolution Settlement coupled with a rejection of most other Whig orthodoxies such as the concept of the "ancient constitution".

Forbes' work on the Scottish Enlightenment led to one of his students, John Dunn, calling him "a Highlander in exile".

Works
'Scientific Whiggism: Adam Smith and John Millar', Cambridge Journal, VII (1954), pp. 643–70.
Hume's Philosophical Politics (Cambridge University Press, 1975).
'Sceptical Whiggism, Commerce and Liberty', in A. S. Skinner and T. Wilson (eds.), Essays on Adam Smith (Oxford University Press, 1976).

Notes

1922 births
1994 deaths
20th-century Scottish historians
Scottish philosophers